Kürdəmir, is a town in and the capital of the Kurdamir Rayon of Azerbaijan.
Kurdamir District, is an administrative district (a 'rayon') in Azerbaijan.
Kürdəmir, Zaqatala, is a village in the Zaqatala Rayon of Azerbaijan.
Kurd Amir, is a village in Juqin Rural District
Kyurdamir Air Base, is a military airbase in Kyurdamir.